Hanneliese Spitz (born 24 November 1941) is an Austrian sprint canoer who competed in the mid-1960s. She won a bronze medal in the K-1 500 m event at the 1963 ICF Canoe Sprint World Championships in Jajce.

Spitz also finished sixth in the K-1 500 m event at the 1964 Summer Olympics in Tokyo.

References

Sports-reference.com profile

1941 births
Austrian female canoeists
Canoeists at the 1964 Summer Olympics
Living people
Olympic canoeists of Austria
ICF Canoe Sprint World Championships medalists in kayak